The Noordzeecross (Dutch for North Sea cross) is a cyclo-cross race held in Middelkerke, Belgium with the first edition in 1959. Since the 2011 edition (2010–2011 season) the race is a part of the Superprestige.

Podiums

Men

Women

References

External links
 

Cyclo-cross races
Cycle races in Belgium
Recurring sporting events established in 1959
Cyclo-cross Superprestige
1959 establishments in Belgium
Sport in West Flanders
Middelkerke